Jade Etherden (born 25 April 1995) is an Australian rugby league footballer who plays as for the St George Illawarra Dragons in the NRL Women's Premiership and Mounties RLFC in the NSWRL Women's Premiership.

Background
Etherden was born in Wollongong and played her junior rugby league for the Woonona Bulls before having to give up the sport when she was 12.

Playing career
In 2011, Etherden returned to rugby league, playing for the Corrimal Cougars in the Illawarra Women's Premiership. In 2016, Etherden played for the Cronulla-Sutherland Sharks in a nines exhibition game against the St George Illawarra Dragons. In 2017, she played for the Dragons in a nines exhibition against the Sharks. On 14 May 2017, she represented NSW Country.

In 2019, Etherden joined the Sharks NSWRL Women's Premiership team.

2020
On 23 September, Etherden was announced as a member of the St George Illawarra Dragons NRL Women's Premiership squad.

References

External links
St George Illawarra Dragons profile

1995 births
Living people
Australian female rugby league players
Rugby league halfbacks
St. George Illawarra Dragons (NRLW) players